Emamzadeh Shah Yalan is a historical structure in Kashan, Iran. It dates back to 1498. It is located in the bazaar of Kashan. On the carved wooden chest on the tomb, the date 951 of the Islamic calendar (1544 in the Gregorian calendar) has been written.

See also 
List of the historical structures in the Isfahan province

References 

Architecture in Iran
Buildings and structures in Kashan